Ručiūnai is a village in Jonava district municipality, in Kaunas County, central Lithuania. According to the 2001 census, the town has a population of 256 people.

References

References 
 Ručiūnai. Mažoji lietuviškoji tarybinė enciklopedija, T. 3 (R–Ž). Vilnius, Vyriausioji enciklopedijų redakcija, 1971, 107 psl.
Ručiūnai. Tarybų Lietuvos enciklopedija, T. 3 (Masaitis-Simno). – Vilnius: Vyriausioji enciklopedijų redakcija, 1987. 576 psl.

External links

Villages in Jonava District Municipality